Streatley Warren is a  biological Site of Special Scientific Interest west of Streatley in Berkshire. It is in the North Wessex Downs, which is an Area of Outstanding Natural Beauty.

Geography

The site runs along The Ridgeway. The site features terraced land in a dry chalk valley.

History

There is evidence discovered that the terracing formed on the site is of Iron Age creation, when an archaeological dig was started on the site in 1948. It is also believed that Romans continued to use this land for farming. During medieval times the land was used for farming rabbits.

Access
Streatley Warren is open access land, but entry is only allowed between November and February.

Fauna

The site has the following fauna:

Birds

Fieldfare
Red kite
Raven
Eurasian skylark
Grey partridge
Northern lapwing
Willow warbler
Eurasian blackcap
Lesser whitethroat
Yellowhammer

Mammals

Hare

Butterflies

Marbled white
Small heath
Common blue

Flora

The site has the following flora:

Trees

Crataegus
Elder
Rhamnus
Juniper
Whitebeam

Plants

Coeloglossum
Gymnadenia conopsea
Filipendula vulgaris
Anthyllis vulneraria
Campanula rotundifolia
Gentianella anglica
Festuca rubra
Festuca ovina
Briza media
Helictotrichon pratense
Koeleria macrantha
Bromus erectus
Carex flacca
Plantago media
Cirsium acaule
Leontodon hispidus
Sanguisorba minor
Scabiosa columbaria
Thymus praecox
Gentianella amarella
Asperula cynanchica
Linum catharticum
Centaurea nigra
Pimpinella saxifraga
Origanum vulgare

References

Sites of Special Scientific Interest in Berkshire